Minsk Region or Minsk Oblast or Minsk Voblasts (Minskaja voblasć ; , Minskaya oblast) is one of the regions of Belarus. Its administrative center is Minsk, although it is a separate administrative territorial entity of Belarus. As of 2011, the region's population is 1,411,500.

Geography
Minsk Region covers a total of 39,900 km², about 19.44% of the national total area. Lake Narach, the largest lake in the country, is located in the northern part of the region. There are four other large lakes in this region: Svir (8th largest), Myadel (11th largest), Syalyava (14th largest) and Myastro (15th largest). It is the only region of Belarus whose border is not part of the international border of Belarus.

History
Beginning the 10th century, the territory of the current Minsk Region was part of Kievan Rus', the Principality of Polotsk, and later it was included in the Grand Duchy of Lithuania. With the unification of the Grand Duchy of Lithuania and the Kingdom of Poland, the territory became part of the Polish–Lithuanian Commonwealth.

In 1793, as a result of the second partition of Polish territory, the area was annexed by Russia as the Minsk Region. During the collapse of the Russian Empire due to the Civil War, the western part was annexed to Poland in 1921, while the east became Soviet Belarus.

The Minsk region was established on 15 January, 1938, based on the amendment of the Constitutional Law of the USSR. As of 20 February, 1938, the area included 20 districts.  Following the Soviet invasion of Poland on September 17, 1939, the former Eastern lands of the Second Polish Republic were annexed in accordance with the Molotov–Ribbentrop Pact partitioning Poland and added to the Minsk Region.

On 20 September 1944, by the decree of the Presidium of the Supreme Soviet of the USSR, the Gressky, Kopyl, Krasnoslobodski, Luban, Slutsky, Starobin, Starodorozhski districts and the city of Sluck were removed from the Minsk region and transferred to the newly formed Bobruisk Region.

On 8 January, 1954, by the decree of the USSR Presidium of the Supreme Soviet, the Nesvizhski and Stolbtsovsky districts from the abolished Baranovichi Region, as well as the Glusk, Gressky, Kopyl, Krasnoslobodski, Luban, Slutsky, Starobin, Starodorozhski districts and the city of Sluck from the abolished Bobruisk Region, were added to the Minsk Region.

In 1960, following the abolition of Molodechno Region, its southern part became the northern part of the Minsk Region.

Tourism
The number of travel agencies in Minsk Region grew from twelve in 2000 to seventy in 2010. The most popular tourist destinations of the region are Zaslavskoye Lake, the Zhdanovichi area which has health resorts, Nesvizh Palace and its surroundings, as well as the alpine ski resorts of Logoysk and Silichi.

Administrative subdivisions
The Minsk Region comprises 22 districts (raions), 307 selsovets, 22 cities, 8 city municipalities, and 20 urban-type settlements.

Districts of Minsk Region

 Barysaw District
 Byerazino District
 Chervyen District
 Dzyarzhynsk District
 Kapyl District
 Kletsk District
 Krupki District
 Lahoysk District
 Lyuban District
 Maladzyechna District
 Minsk District
 Myadzyel District
 Nesvizh District
 Puchavičy District
 Salihorsk District
 Slutsk District
 Smalyavichy District
 Staryya Darohi District
 Stowbtsy District
 Uzda District
 Valozhyn District
 Vileyka District

Cities and towns
Population of cities and towns in Minsk Region

Demographics

See also
 Administrative divisions of Belarus
 Villages in Minsk Region

References

External links
 
 

 
Regions of Belarus